William Donaldson Dickey (January 11, 1845 – May 14, 1924) was an American soldier who received the Medal of Honor for valor during the American Civil War.

Biography
Dickey was commissioned as a 1st lieutenant in November 1862, and assigned to the 168th New York Volunteer Infantry. He mustered out with the regiment in October 1863, and joined the 15th New York Heavy Artillery as a captain in February 1864. He was promoted to major in May 1865, and mustered out with the 15th New York Heavy Artillery in August 1865. Dickey received the Medal of Honor on June 10, 1896, for his actions at the Second Battle of Petersburg.

After the war, Dickey became a companion of the District of Columbia Commandery of the Military Order of the Loyal Legion of the United States.

Medal of Honor citation
Citation:

 Refused to leave the field, remaining in command after being wounded by a piece of shell, and led his command in the assault on the enemy's works on the following day.

See also

List of American Civil War Medal of Honor recipients: A-F

References

External links
Military Times

1845 births
1924 deaths
Union Army officers
United States Army Medal of Honor recipients
People of New York (state) in the American Civil War
American Civil War recipients of the Medal of Honor